The ISEQ Smallcaps index is a benchmark stock market index composed of companies that trade on the Euronext Dublin. The index comprises the smaller companies contained within the ISEQ Overall Index. 
The Small Cap Index represents an asset class of its own, i.e. the smaller quoted companies. This type of asset class offers potential for growth which may not always seen in larger entities. It also represents an attractive asset class from the portfolio theory perspective; i.e. diversification into chosen smaller capitalisation stocks is likely to improve the risk return equation for investors.

Due to the nature of the index prices of shares of the ISEQ Smallcaps are more volatile: as trading volumes and liquidity are smaller compared to the ISEQ 20 or ISEQ Overall stocks changes in prices (in percentage) can be much greater than with the more liquid and higher volume shares.

Inclusion criteria and other rules
Originally only stocks that were part of the ISEQ Overall index on 4 January 1999 and a market capitalisation at that date of € 400.000.000 or less were included in the list. For shares that were floated on the ISEQ after the date of 04-01-1999 the following criteria must be met to be included in the Smallcaps index:
 
 Companies must be eligible for inclusion in ISEQ Overall Index
 Companies which are included in the ISEQ 20 Index are excluded
 Companies must have a market capitalisation of less than or equal to the current SCI Market Cap Threshold

If a company de-lists or is removed from the ISEQ then it will also be excluded from this index. Also if the shares are included in the ISEQ 20 index they will be removed from the Smallcaps index.

Index base date and value
The index is based on the value of the underlying shares on 4 January 1999 and the index was set at 1.000. Publication of this index started on 1 December 1999.

Listing review
The listing of companies in this index is reviewed every 3 months: March, June, September and December.

Constituents
As of March 2014, the list comprised the following companies:

 Abbey Plc.
 Allied Irish Banks
 AMINEX Plc.
 Conroy Gold and Natural Resources
 CPL Resources Plc.
 Datalex
 Donegal Investment Group
 Fastnet Oil & Gas
 First Derivatives
 Great Western Mining Corporation
 IFG Group
 Independent News & Media
 Karelian Diamond Resources
 Mainstay Medical International Plc
 Merrion Pharmaceuticals
 Mincon Group
 Ormonde Mining
 OVOCA Gold
 Permanent TSB Group Holdings
 Petroneft Resources
 Prime Active Capital
 UTV Media
 Zamano

References

External links
Official ISEQ Small prices from Euronext
Official ISEQ Small composition from Euronext

Euronext indices
Economy of the Republic of Ireland